Sulaiman Al Nassr (Arabic:سليمان النصر) (born 27 October 1984) is a Qatari footballer.

External links
 

Qatari footballers
1984 births
Living people
Al-Arabi SC (Qatar) players
Al Kharaitiyat SC players
Qatar Stars League players
Qatari Second Division players
Association football fullbacks